eRacks Open Source Systems was founded in 1999.  The company provides computer systems based on open source software, including various distributions of Linux, *BSD and OpenSolaris, and manufactures rack-mounted servers (including NAS systems, firewalls, mail and web servers), desktops, laptops and netbooks.

Business
eRacks also manufactures quiet systems for recording studios.

References

Computer storage companies